Mervyn Conn (born 5 February 1935) is a British music promoter and entrepreneur.

He started work in the fashion industry, but by the early 1960s, with the help of his cousin, the comedian Bernie Winters, he had begun running a club, Romano's, in Gerrard Street in Soho, London.  He worked closely with agent Joe Collins (the father of Joan and Jackie Collins), and staged the first Beatles Christmas Shows in 1963.  He then managed many of the major pop music touring shows in the UK, including those headlined by such bands and musicians as P.J. Proby, The Byrds, Johnny Cash, Billie Jo Spears, Chubby Checker, Marlene Dietrich, Sarah Vaughan, Chuck Berry, Peggy Lee, the Red Army Ensemble and many more.   He also directed the Melody Maker Pop Shows held at Wembley Arena in the 1960s, before launching the annual International Festivals of Country Music held at the same venue between 1969 and 1991.  The shows were later taken into Europe, and featured such stars as Johnny Cash, Dolly Parton, Tammy Wynette, Billie Jo Spears, and Jerry Lee Lewis.  More recently he has been responsible for major touring shows including Annie and Three Steps To Heaven.

In 1989, Conn was convicted of a serious sexual assault on his 19-year-old receptionist and was sentenced to eight weeks in prison. In July 2014, he was arrested at Gatwick airport in connection with an alleged historic rape and sexual assault.

In October 2016 Mervyn Conn was convicted of historic offences of 2 rapes and 1 sexual assault, and was sentenced to 15 years imprisonment with a minimum of 7 years before parole can be considered

In 2010 Conn published an autobiography, Mr Music Man: My Life in Showbiz.

References

1935 births
Living people
British music industry executives